Bugkalot (also Ilongot) is a language of the indigenous Bugkalot people of northern Luzon, Philippines.

Distribution
Ethnologue lists the following provinces in which Ilongot is spoken.
Most of Quirino Province north of the Cagayan River
Eastern Nueva Vizcaya Province
Southern Isabela Province (upper reaches of the Cagayan River)

Dialects
Ethnologue lists the following dialects.
Abaka (Abaca)
Egongot
Ibalao (Ibilao)
Italon
Iyongut

Alternate names include Bugkalut, Bukalot, and Lingotes.

References

Languages of Quirino
Languages of Isabela (province)
Languages of Nueva Vizcaya
South–Central Cordilleran languages